Chloroclystis zhuoxinensis is a moth in the family Geometridae. It is endemic to China.

References

External links

Moths described in 1978
zhuoxinensis
Endemic fauna of China